Zacorisca euthalama is a species of moth of the family Tortricidae. It is found on Seram Island of Indonesia.

The wingspan is 30–32 mm. The forewings are whitish yellow, becoming light ochreous yellow posteriorly. The markings are blue blackish or purple blackish and there are streaks along the costa and dorsum.

The hindwings are light ochreous yellowish, sometimes coppery tinged, but paler towards the base. The dorsal area is suffused grey and there is a grey line extending along the lower edge of the cell. There is a blackish reniform (kidney shaped) spot before the apex and one or two smaller spots before the termen below the middle.

References

	

Moths described in 1924
Zacorisca